Hurst is a city in the U.S. state of Texas located in the densely populated portion of northeastern Tarrant County and is part of the Dallas–Fort Worth metropolitan area. It is considered a Dallas and Fort Worth suburb and is part of the Mid-Cities region. It is 13 miles from the Dallas/Fort Worth International Airport. As of the 2020 census, it had a population of 40,413.

The City of Hurst is surrounded by other communities including Bedford, Euless, Fort Worth, Richland Hills, North Richland Hills, Grapevine, and Colleyvile. Hurst's education system is sponsored and served by the Hurst-Euless-Bedford Independent School District, while other school districts Grapevine-Colleyville ISD and Birdville ISD serve the far north and far west portions.

Places of importance inside Hurst include the Tarrant County College campus that was built in 1961, the newly constructed Tarrant County Northeast Courthouse, the headquarters of Bell Helicopter (considered to be in the city limits of Fort Worth), The Hurst/Bell Station (opened in September 2000) that is jointly owned by the Dallas Area Rapid Transit and the Trinity Railway Express. The city's premier shopping center, North East Mall that was ranked the #1 Shopping Mall in Tarrant County and is the third largest mall in the state of Texas. The North East Mall opened in March 1972 (sources vary), is owned by the Indianapolis-based Simon Property Group. Hurst's only cinema complex, the North East Cinemark Rave 18 opened in 2004.

Respectively in 2012, Hurst was ranked at #48 as one of the Best Dallas Suburbs according to D Magazine.

Demographics

2020 census

As of the 2020 United States census, there were 40,413 people, 14,340 households, and 9,556 families residing in the city.

2011
As of the census of 2011, there were 37,337 people, 14,652 households, and 10,261 families residing in the city. The population density was 3,662.6 people per square mile (1,414.7/km2). There were 15,761 housing units at an average density of 1,487.2 per square mile (574.4/km2). The racial makeup of the city was 63.7% White, 5.6% African American, 0.7% Native American, 2.3% Asian, 0.3% Pacific Islander, 7.20% from other races, and 1.93% from two or more races. Hispanic or Latino of any race were 24.1% of the population.

There were 14,652 households, out of which 33.5% had children under the age of 18 living with them, 57.2% were married couples living together, 11.6% had a female householder with no husband present, and 27.1% were non-families. 22.4% of all households were made up of individuals, and 7.2% had someone living alone who was 65 years of age or older. The average household size was 2.56 and the average family size was 2.99.

In the city, the population was spread out, with 25.5% under the age of 18, 8.3% from 18 to 24, 30.3% from 25 to 44, 23.6% from 45 to 64, and 12.4% who were 65 years of age or older. The median age was 37 years. For every 100 females, there were 94.6 males. For every 100 females age 18 and over, there were 91.2 males.

The median income for a household in the city was $50,369, and the median income for a family was $57,955. Males had a median income of $40,734 versus $29,551 for females. The per capita income for the city was $23,247. About 4.5% of families and 6.6% of the population were below the poverty line, including 10.4% of those under age 18 and 3.7% of those age 65 or over.

Places
Places in Hurst include North East Mall, an upscale mall owned by Indianapolis-based Simon Property Group, Rave Motion Pictures, which is the major attraction of the city, and Chisholm Park.

The city features two city run water parks, an athletic center, and a wide variety of restaurants.

Surrounding municipalities

Government

Local government

Hurst runs on a city council – manager system. The city has a council of seven members, each serving 2-year terms. Three members are elected in odd years, four in even years.

The structure of the management and coordination of city services is:

The city of Hurst is a voluntary member  of the North Central Texas Council of Governments association, the purpose of which is to coordinate individual and collective local governments and facilitate regional solutions, eliminate unnecessary duplication, and enable joint decisions.

Economy

Top employers
According to Hurst's 2021 Annual Comprehensive Financial Report, the principal employers in the city are:

Education

Most of Hurst is within the boundaries of the Hurst-Euless-Bedford Independent School District. HEB ISD's Lawrence D. Bell High School is the only high school in the city and serves more than 2,100 students. Smaller portions of Hurst are within the boundaries of Birdville ISD, Grapevine-Colleyville ISD, and Keller ISD.

Sections in GCISD are zoned to: Bransford Elementary School, Colleyville Middle School, and Grapevine High School.

The Northeast Campus of Tarrant County College is located in Hurst, and has grown from 8,053 students in 1976–1977 to serve 13,198 students in 2016–2017.

Arts and culture

The Artisan Center Theater is a community theater located in Hurst, built in 2003. It is a 150-seat theater in the round that hosts productions of musicals and plays, as well as offers performing arts classes and education to the community.

Notable people
Ron Faurot, former NFL and University of Arkansas standout
Marshall Henderson, basketball player at Ole Miss; currently playing professionally overseas
Tommy Maddox, former NFL and XFL quarterback
Alex Reymundo, comedian
Olivia Scott Welch, actress
Buddy Whittington, Texas blues guitarist (with John Mayall's Bluesbreakers)

Places
 North East Mall
 Chisholm Park

References

External links
 City of Hurst official website
 HEB Chamber of Commerce
 L.D. Bell High School
 Historic photos of Hurst hosted by the Portal to Texas History

Dallas–Fort Worth metroplex
Cities in Tarrant County, Texas
Cities in Texas